Lodovico Centofiorini or Francesco Centofiorini (died 1651) was a Roman Catholic prelate who served as Bishop of Nicotera (1650–1651).

Biography
On 2 May 1650, Lodovico Centofiorini was appointed during the papacy of Pope Innocent X as Bishop of Nicotera.
On 8 May 1650, he was consecrated bishop by Tiberio Cenci, Bishop of Jesi, with Fabio Olivadisi, Bishop of Catanzaro, and Bartolomeo Vannini, Bishop of Nepi e Sutri, serving as co-consecrators. 
He served as Bishop of Nicotera until his death in 1651.

References 

17th-century Italian Roman Catholic bishops
Bishops appointed by Pope Innocent X
1651 deaths